Samuel Hopkinson (9 February 1903 – 9 May 1958) was an English footballer. His regular position was as a forward. He was born in Killamarsh, North East Derbyshire. He played for Shirebrook, Valley Road BC, Chesterfield, Ashton National, Manchester United and Tranmere Rovers.

External links
MUFCInfo.com profile

1903 births
People from Killamarsh
Footballers from Derbyshire
1958 deaths
English footballers
Chesterfield F.C. players
Manchester United F.C. players
Tranmere Rovers F.C. players
Ashton National F.C. players
Association football forwards